2 Hype is the debut studio album by American rap duo Kid 'n Play. It was released on October 26, 1988, through Select Records. Recording sessions took place at Bayside Sound Recording Studio in New York. Production was handled by Hurby "Luv Bug" Azor and the Invincibles. It features the lone guest appearance from The Real Roxanne.

The album reached number 96 on the Billboard 200, number nine on the Top R&B/Hip-Hop Albums and was certified Gold by the Recording Industry Association of America. Three singles found success on the Billboard Hot R&B/Hip-Hop Songs and Hot Rap Songs charts: "Rollin' with Kid 'n Play" (No. 11 and No. 2, respectively), "2 Hype" (No. 46 and No. 19, respectively) and "Gittin' Funky" (No. 53 and No. 24, respectively).

Critical reception
The Rolling Stone Album Guide called the album "witty and entertaining," writing that "its amiable energy never disappoints."

In 2008, "Rollin' with Kid 'n Play" was ranked #63 on VH1's 100 Greatest Songs of Hip Hop.

Track listing

Charts

Certifications

References

External links

1988 debut albums
Kid 'n Play albums
Select Records albums
Albums produced by Hurby Azor
New jack swing albums